Metaxys is a genus of beetle in the family Carabidae first described by Maximilien Chaudoir in 1857.

Species 
Metaxys contains the following eighteen species:

 Metaxys amoenulus (Boheman, 1848)
 Metaxys basilewskyi (Straneo, 1953)
 Metaxys biguttatus Chaudoir, 1874
 Metaxys bipustulatus (Dejean, 1831)
 Metaxys bisignatus Chaudoir, 1857
 Metaxys congoensis (Straneo, 1954)
 Metaxys ellipticus (Straneo, 1948)
 Metaxys intermedius (Straneo, 1979)
 Metaxys iridescens (Murray, 1859)
 Metaxys kivuensis Burgeon, 1935
 Metaxys latithorax (Straneo, 1948)
 Metaxys minor (Straneo, 1951)
 Metaxys mirei (Straneo, 1991)
 Metaxys obesulus (Straneo, 1951)
 Metaxys rhodesianus Peringuey, 1908
 Metaxys schoutedeni Burgeon, 1935
 Metaxys sudanensis (Straneo, 1948)
 Metaxys ugandae (Straneo, 1948)

References

Pterostichinae